Onchi (written: 恩地) is a Japanese surname. Notable people with the surname include:

, Japanese film and television director
, Japanese print-maker

Japanese-language surnames